Yennenga was a legendary princess, considered the mother of the Mossi people of Burkina Faso. She was a famous warrior precious for her father, Naa Gbewaa or Nedega, the founder of the kingdom of Dagbon, now in present day Ghana. But the princess aspired to another destiny and decided to leave the kingdom. On the run with her horse, she meets a young hunter, Rialé with whom she had a child called Ouedraogo. Ouedraogo is a famous last name in Burkina Faso and means "male horse" in honor to the horse which leads the princess to Rialé. Yennenga or her son Ouedraogo are considered the founder of the Mossi Kingdoms. There are different versions about the escape of the princess.

Biography
Yennenga was a princess of Burkina Faso, who lived over 900 years ago, the daughter of the king Nedega and the queen Napoko. Nedega was an early 12th-century king of the Dagbon Kingdom in what is now northern Ghana. Her father raised her to be a skilled hunter and fighter. She was beautiful (her name, Yennenga, means "the slim" referring to her beauty) and became a cultural icon, a woman with a strong character and an independent mind and beloved princess who from the age of 14, fought in battle for her father against the neighbouring Malinkés. Skilled with javelins, spears and bows, she was an excellent horsewoman and commanded her own battalion. Yennenga was such an important fighter that when she reached a marriageable age, her father refused to choose a husband for her or allow her to marry. To express her unhappiness to her father, Yennenga planted a field of wheat. When the crop grew, she let it rot. She explained to her father that  was how she felt, being unable to marry. Nedega failed to be moved by this gesture and locked his daughter up.

One of the king's horsemen helped Yennenga, disguised as a man, escape on her stallion. Attacked by Malinkés, her companion was killed, and Yennenga was left alone. She continued to ride north. One night, when she was exhausted from crossing a river, Yennenga's stallion took her into a forest. She met and befriended a solitary elephant hunter called Riale. When he saw through Yennenga's disguise, they fell in love. Yennenga and Riale had a son they named Ouedraogo, which means "stallion" and is now a common name in Burkina Faso. Ouedrago visited his grandfather King Nadega, who has been searching for Princess Yennenga over the years. On discovering his daughter was still alive, King Nadega arranged for a feast as well as sent delegates to retrieve his beloved daughter back home. Princess Yennenga together with Raile returned to the Dagomba kingdom with open arms from her father; who ensured that his grandson Ouedraogo received the best of trainings. He was also gifted with cavalry, cattle and other goods which was used to set up Mossi kingdom. Ouedraogo founded the Mossi Kingdom.

Legacy
Yennenga is considered by the Mossi to be the mother of their empire and many statues of her can be found in the capital city of Burkina Faso, Ouagadougou. A statue of a golden stallion, called the Étalon de Yennenga, is awarded as the first prize in the biennial Panafrican Film and Television Festival of Ouagadougou (FESPACO). The national football team is nicknamed "Les Étalons" ("the Stallions") in reference to Yennenga's stallion. Since 2017, a project of a new city is in progress near Ouagadougou and will be called Yennenga.

Literature and film
 La fille de la Volta
 LOOFO

References

12th-century births
12th-century deaths
12th-century women
African women in war
Burkinabé royalty
Burkinabé women
Ghanaian royalty
Mythological princesses
Women in 12th-century warfare
12th-century Burkinabé people